Dax S. Griffin (born March 22, 1972) is an American actor. He is known for portraying younger Hank Pym in Ant-Man and its sequel Ant-Man and the Wasp.

Career
Griffin is known for his role as Tim Truman on the NBC serial Sunset Beach from January 1997 until November 1999. He had one more appearance in the series finale in a dream sequence. He also played assistant district attorney Justin McCoy on All My Children in 2003.

Griffin joined the cast of The Bold and the Beautiful in the role of Shane McGrath on September 12, 2006.  He left the show on April 20, 2007, when his character was killed off.

Griffin also played Albert Grabner in the TV commercial for the Japanese video game Front Mission: Gun Hazard, and is listed in the game's credits for that role.

Griffin made an appearance as "Bester" on Firefly as Serenitys original engine mechanic.  He has also made guest appearances on Charmed, CSI, and Drop Dead Diva.

Personal life
Griffin was born in Atlanta, Georgia. He grew up in the Atlanta suburb of Marietta and graduated from Joseph Wheeler High School in 1990.  In 1995, he graduated from the University of Alabama with a degree in business marketing.

He was in a relationship with actress Amelia Heinle (Victoria, The Young and the Restless) and was also involved with former The Bold and the Beautiful co-star Jennifer Gareis.
He spends his time with his two dogs, and competes in local 10k runs.

Filmography

References

External links
 

1972 births
American male soap opera actors
American male television actors
Living people
University of Alabama alumni